Ryan Patric Flinn (born February 14, 1980, in Ft. Myers, Florida) is a former American football punter. He played college football at UCF.

College career
Flinn attended the University of Central Florida, where, as a senior, he won All-Mid-American Conference honors after averaging 41.8 yards per punt.

Professional career
Flinn made his NFL debut with the Green Bay Packers on December 25, 2005, in a game against the Chicago Bears. He had previously spent time in training camp with the Dallas Cowboys and Atlanta Falcons but was cut in August both times.

On February 19, 2007, Flinn was signed by the Miami Dolphins. He was released by the team on August 27, losing out to rookie punter Brandon Fields.

Personal
Up until he played with the Packers, Flinn was a bartender.

External links
Atlanta Falcons Bio
Dallas Cowboys Bio

1980 births
Living people
American football punters
Green Bay Packers players
Atlanta Falcons players
Dallas Cowboys players
Miami Dolphins players
UCF Knights football players